Heydar is a common male given name in Greater Iran, particularly in Iran and Azerbaijan. A variant of the Arabic name Haydar (also spelt Heidar, Haider, and other variants), it was a cognomen of Ali, who was known for his courage in battle.

Heydar is sometimes transliterated as Gaidar or Geidar, from the Cyrillic spelling Гейдар.

The name may refer to:

People

Heydar Latifiyan  (1879-1915) a famous Iranian
Heydar Aliyev (1923–2003), Azerbaijani politician and president
Heydar Babayev (born 1957), Azerbaijani politician
Heydar Ghiai (1922–1985), Iranian architect
Heydar Huseynov (1908–1950), Azerbaijani philosopher 
Heydar Moslehi (born 1957), Iranian politician 
Heydar Yaghma (1926–1986), Iranian poet

See also
Heydar Alat, Iran
Heydar Babaya Salam, a work of poetry
Heydar Baghi, Iran
Heydar Didehban, Iran
Heydar-e Posht-e Shahr, Iran
Heydar Kar, Iran
Heydar Kola, Iran
Heydari (name), an Iranian surname

References

Azerbaijani masculine given names
Persian masculine given names